Julius Talbot Keller (21 December 1890, in Aachen – 16 May 1946, in Aachen) was a German expressionist poet. He was associated with the Circle of Rheinish Expressionists. After spending 1914-1917 in the German Army, he went into exile in Switzerland where he was active in literary circles. He endeavoured to capture the nightmare experience of life at the frontline.

Publications
 (1916) Budgetrecht und Organisationsgewalt Heidelberg: Rössler & Herbert
 (1918) Durchblutung Berlin: Aktion
 (1919) Was sind Revolutionen? Halle: Joest

References

1890 births
1946 deaths
People from Aachen
People from the Rhine Province
20th-century German poets
German male poets
German Expressionist writers
Writers from North Rhine-Westphalia
Expressionist poets
20th-century German male writers